Events from the year 1870 in art.

Events
 June 28 – Claude Monet marries his mistress and model Camille Doncieux in Paris; Gustave Courbet is a witness.
 July – Franco-Prussian War breaks out: Monet, Pissarro, Daubigny and the dealer Paul Durand-Ruel flee to London; Cézanne and his mistress, Marie-Hortense Fiquet, leave Paris for L'Estaque (on the French Riviera) where he predominantly paints landscapes. In August, Frédéric Bazille joins a Zouave regiment. In September the Dutch painter Lourens Alma Tadema moves permanently to London where he adopts the name Lawrence Alma-Tadema.
 Édouard Manet and Louis Edmond Duranty fight a duel at Café Guerbois, Paris.
 Russian industrialist and patron of the arts Savva Mamontov acquires the Abramtsevo Colony and hosts a group of traditionalist artists there.
 Dante Gabriel Rossetti's Poems are published, exhumed from Elizabeth Siddal's grave.
 Daoud Corm goes to Rome to study under Roberto Bompiani at the Accademia di San Luca.

Paintings

 Wilhelm Amberg – Reading from Goethe's Werther (Vorlesung aus Goethes Werther)
 Frédéric Bazille
 Countryside near Lex
 Studio in the rue Condamine
 La Toilette
 Cathy Madox Brown – Ford Madox Brown at his Easel
 Ford Madox Brown – Romeo and Juliet
 Edward Burne-Jones – Phyllis and Demophoon
 Paul Cézanne – Paul Alexis reading a manuscript to Émile Zola (1869–70; São Paulo Museum of Art)
 Edgar Degas
 The Dancing Class
 The Orchestra at the Opéra
 Jean-Jules-Antoine Lecomte du Nouÿ – Demosthenes Practicing Oratory (Démosthène s'exerçant à la parole)
 Henri Fantin-Latour – A Studio in the Batignolles (Musée d'Orsay, Paris)
 Anselm Feuerbach – The Judgement of Paris (c. 1869–70)
 Mariano Fortuny – The Spanish Wedding (Museu Nacional d'Art de Catalunya)
 Jean-Léon Gérôme – Moorish Bath
 Arthur Hughes – You Cannot Barre Love Oute
 Jean-Paul Laurens – Pope Formosus and Stephen VI (Le Pape Formose et Étienne VII)
 Édouard Manet
 La Brioche (Metropolitan Museum of Art, New York)
 Effect of Snow on Petit-Montrouge (National Museum Cardiff)
 John Everett Millais – The Boyhood of Raleigh (Tate Britain, London)
 Pierre-Auguste Renoir
 Madame Clémentine Valensi Stora (L'Algérienne)
 La Promenade
 Dante Gabriel Rossetti
 Beata Beatrix (approximate completion date)
 Sibylla Palmifera
 Dmitri Sinodi-Popov – An Old Greek
 James Tissot
 Captain Frederick Gustavus Burnaby
 La Partie carrée
 Raja Ravi Varma – Shakuntala

Sculpture
 Statue of Abraham Lincoln (New York City)

Awards
 Grand Prix de Rome, painting:
 Grand Prix de Rome, sculpture:
 Grand Prix de Rome, architecture: Albert-Félix-Théophile Thomas.
 Grand Prix de Rome, music: Charles Edouard Lefebvre & Henri Maréchal

Births
 January 1 – Louis Vauxcelles, French Jewish art critic (died 1943)
 January 11 – Alexander Stirling Calder, American sculptor (died 1945)
 February 5 – C. E. Brock, English painter and illustrator (died 1938)
 March 13 – William Glackens, American painter (died 1938)
 June 22 – Antonio Dattilo Rubbo, Italian-born painter and art teacher (died 1955)
 July 21 – Emil Orlík, Czech-born painter and lithographer (died 1932)
 July 25 – Maxfield Parrish, American painter and illustrator (died 1966)
 November 18 – Franz Metzner, German sculptor (died 1919)
 November 25 – Maurice Denis, French painter and decorative artist (died 1943)
 December 23 – John Marin, American painter (died 1953)
 date unknown – Arthur Diehl, English-born landscape painter (died 1929)

Deaths
 January 17 – Alexander Anderson, American illustrator (born 1775)
 January 27 – Johannes Flintoe, Danish-Norwegian painter of Norwegian landscapes (born 1787)
 February 21 – Robert Jefferson Bingham, English-born photographer (born 1824 or 1825)
 March 19 – William Egley, English miniature painter (born 1798)
 April 25 – Daniel Maclise, Irish-born painter (born 1806)
 May 17 – David Octavius Hill, Scottish painter and pioneer photographer (born 1802)
 July 13 – Christian Albrecht Jensen, Danish painter (born 1792)
 August 25 – Richard Seymour-Conway, 4th Marquess of Hertford, English francophile art collector (born 1800)
 November 7 – Cornelia Aletta van Hulst, Dutch painter (born 1797)
 November 28 – Frédéric Bazille, French Impressionist painter (born 1841) (killed in action)
 December 9
 Max Emanuel Ainmiller, German glass painter (born 1807)
 Patrick MacDowell, Irish sculptor from Belfast (born 1799)
 December 12 – Martin Cregan, Irish portrait painter (born 1788)
 Undated – Achille Leonardi, Italian genre painter (born 1800)

References

 
Years of the 19th century in art
1870s in art